Campylium elodes is a species of moss belonging to the family Amblystegiaceae.

Synonyms:
 Amblystegium elodes Lindb.
 Hypnum helodes Spruce ex Fam.
 Stereodon polymorphus Mitt.

References

Amblystegiaceae